Nils Pfingsten-Reddig (born May 23, 1982) is a German retired professional footballer.

References

External links
 
 

1982 births
Living people
People from Gehrden
Association football midfielders
German footballers
Hannover 96 players
Kickers Emden players
Wuppertaler SV players
Sportfreunde Siegen players
Kickers Offenbach players
FC Rot-Weiß Erfurt players
FSV Wacker 90 Nordhausen players
3. Liga players
Regionalliga players
Footballers from Lower Saxony